Veress is a surname. Notable people with the surname include:

Lajos Veress (1889–1976), Hungarian military officer
Matyas Veress, film editor
Sándor Veress (1907–1992), Hungarian-born Swiss composer
Zsuzsanna Veress (born 1976), Hungarian handball player
János Veres(s) (1903–1979), a Hungarian internist

See also
Veress needle, surgical instrument